James E. Powers (born May 30, 1931) is an American politician from New York.

Life
He was born on May 30, 1931, in Chicago, Illinois. He graduated B.Sc. from Northern Illinois University, and M.A. in labor and industrial relations from the University of Illinois. He taught at East High School, in Rochester, New York from 1958 to 1966. He married Lucille Ann DeFrank. He entered politics as a Democrat.

Powers was a member of the New York State Assembly in 1965 and 1966.

He was a member of the New York State Senate from 1967 to 1972, sitting in the 177th, 178th and 179th New York State Legislatures.

References

1931 births
Living people
People from Chicago
Politicians from Rochester, New York
Democratic Party New York (state) state senators
Democratic Party members of the New York State Assembly
Northern Illinois University alumni
University of Illinois alumni